Siah Tir-e Pain (also Romanized as Sīāh Tīr-e Pā’īn; also known as Sīāh Tīr and Sīāh Tīreh-ye Pā’īn) is a village in Eskelabad Rural District, Nukabad District, Khash County, Sistan and Baluchestan Province, Iran. At the 2006 census, its population was 77, in 20 families.

References 

Populated places in Khash County